In quantum computing, a graph state is a special type of multi-qubit state that can be represented by a graph. Each qubit is represented by a vertex of the graph, and there is an edge between every interacting pair of qubits. In particular, they are a convenient way of representing certain types of entangled states.

Graph states are useful in quantum error-correcting codes, entanglement measurement and purification and for characterization of computational resources in measurement based quantum computing models.

Formal definition 
Quantum graph states can be defined in two equivalent ways: through the notion of quantum circuits and stabilizer formalism.

Quantum circuit definition 
Given a graph , with the set of vertices  and the set of edges , the corresponding graph state is defined as

where  and the operator  is the controlled-Z interaction between the two vertices (corresponding to two qubits)  and

Stabilizer formalism definition 

An alternative and equivalent definition is the following, which makes use of the stabilizer formalism.

Define an operator  for each vertex  of :

The  operators commute. The graph state  is defined as the simultaneous -eigenvalue eigenstate of the  operators :

Equivalence between the two definitions 
A proof of the equivalence of the two definitions can be found in.

Examples 

 If  is a three-vertex path, then the  stabilizers are

The corresponding quantum state is

 

 If  is a triangle on three vertices, then the  stabilizers are

The corresponding quantum state is

 

More generally, two graph states are locally equivalent if and only if the corresponding graphs are related by a sequence of so-called "local complementation" steps, as shown by Van den Nest et al. (2005).

See also 
 Entanglement
 Cluster state

References

External links
Quantum graph states: two equivalent definitions

Quantum information science